Athmakur (S) mandal is one of the 23 mandals in Suryapet district of the Indian state of Telangana. It is under the administration of Suryapet revenue division with its headquarters at Atmakur. It is bounded by Chivvemla mandal towards South, Nuthankal mandal towards North, Mothey mandal towards East, Suryapet mandal towards South.

Geography
It is in the 185 m elevation (altitude).

Demographics
Athmakur (S) mandal is having population of 49,419 living in 11,582 Houses. Males are 25,167 and Females are 24,252. Gollaguda is the smallest Village and Aipur is the biggest Village in the mandal.

Villages
 census of India, the mandal has 20 settlements.
The settlements in the mandal are listed below:

Notes
(†) Mandal headquarter

References

Mandals in Suryapet district